In Films is an Australian independent television production company. It specialises in factual television, including the documentary series Hitting Home and Revelation; the US series Borderland; and the feature documentary Firestarter: The Story of Bangarra. The company has won three Walkley Documentary Awards.

History
In Films was founded founded in 2013 by Nial Fulton and Ivan O'Mahoney.

Productions 
The company collaborated with journalist Sarah Ferguson on the documentaries Revelation and Hitting Home. Journalists Dan Box (The Queen & Zak Grieve) and Yaara Bou Melhem (Unseen Skies) have recently worked with the company. 

In 2019, Nel Minchin co-directed Firestarter: The Story of Bangarra, her third production with In Films.  She is directing a two-part series for ABC about controversial Australian athlete Israel Folau.

In 2022, In Films produced Bloodguilt for Audible.

Filmography and key awards

References

External links 
 

Television production companies of Australia
Australian companies established in 2013
2013 establishments in Australia
Companies based in Sydney